Cochlodina costata is a species of air-breathing land snail, a terrestrial pulmonate gastropod mollusk in the family Clausiliidae, the door snails, all of which have a clausilium.

Distribution
Its native distribution is the Eastern Alps and Sudetes. It occurs in:

 Czech Republic - Cochlodina costata commutata (Rossmässler, 1836) - Bohemia, Moravia
 and others

References

Clausiliidae
Gastropods described in 1828